Frank Richard Heartz (January 7, 1871 – August 27, 1955) was a Canadian politician who served as the 12th Lieutenant Governor of Prince Edward Island.

He was born in 1871 in Charlottetown, Prince Edward Island, the  son of Benjamin Heartz and Henrietta Davison. He was educated in local public schools, followed by Prince of Wales College and Upper Canada College.

He married Bessie Matthew of Souris on September 25, 1895.

In his political career, Heartz ran for the 1st Kings District in the Provincial Legislative Assembly in 1909 but was defeated. Heartz was appointed Lieutenant-Governor of Prince Edward Island on September 8, 1924, and served until November 19, 1930. He died in Charlottetown.

1871 births
1955 deaths
People from Charlottetown
Lieutenant Governors of Prince Edward Island